Peter Holland (born 1947) (real name Austin Holland) is a senior lecturer in the Western Australian Academy of Performing Arts in Perth, Western Australia. He previously had a long and distinguished career as a broadcaster, interviewer and newsreader. He worked for the Australian Broadcasting Corporation in radio and television news from 1966 to 1998 when he moved to  Channel Nine to read the television news.

In the 1984 federal election he unsuccessfully ran for the seat of Forrest for the Australian Labor Party.

In 1995, he won the Western Australian Citizen Of The Year (community services) award.  He won the Premier's Book Award in 1994 for an anthology of Western Australian writing.

In 2003, in the midst of National Nine News''' national dominance in the ratings, Holland left his role with local television station STW and took up a full-time teaching post with Edith Cowan University, having been a part-time member of staff since 2001. Since 2005, he has been coordinator of the Graduate Diploma of Broadcasting course at the Western Australian Academy of Performing Arts (WAAPA) at the Edith Cowan University campus.Chiara Dichiera 

Holland currently resides in the Perth Hills where he has lived since 1972.

Works
 As Interviewer - in - Talking theatre. (1993) Perth, W.A : PICA Press, . "This small volume consists of interviews first broadcast on the ABC Radio programme `Peter Holland's Sunday' April to August 1993 on 720 6WF" included: Bill Dunstone, Andrew Ross, Alan Becher, Angela Chaplin, Barry Moreland, Edgar Metcalfe, David Britton, David Hough, David Williams (journalist), Geoff Kelso and Ray Omodei.
 As editor -(1993)  Summer shorts : stories-poems-articles-images, South Fremantle, W.A : Fremantle Arts Centre Press. 
 As editor - with Barbara Holland (1994) Summer shorts : stories-poems-articles-images. 2, South Fremantle, W.A : Fremantle Arts Centre Press. 
 With - Liz Byrski. (1996) The grapevine : quick and tasty cookbook'' . South Fremantle, W.A. : Fremantle Arts Centre Press.

References

ABC News (Australia) presenters
Nine News presenters
1947 births
Living people
People from Perth, Western Australia
Academic staff of Edith Cowan University